V3 or V03 may refer to:

Medicine
 Mandibular nerve, (V3),division of the trigeminal nerve 
 ATC code V03, a subgroup of the Anatomical Therapeutic Chemical Classification System
 Area V3 of the visual cortex
 V3, one of six precordial leads in electrocardiography

Technology
 V3 Gaming PC, an American manufacturer of custom-built personal computers
 V3 engine, a combustion engine configuration
 Motorola RAZR V3, a series of mobile phones
 V3 Supercharger, third generation 250 kW battery charger for Tesla electric cars
 Z3, where it is previously known as V3

Other
 V-3 cannon, a large-calibre German World War II gun
 LNER Class V3, a class of British steam locomotives
 Belize's International Telecommunication Union callsign prefix 
 Carpatair's IATA code
 Past participle form (V3) of an English verb
 V3, or v3.co.uk, a British technology news website published by Incisive Media
 V3 (music group), an urban contemporary gospel group from the United States